Penepissonotus is a genus of delphacid planthoppers in the family Delphacidae. There is at least one described species in Penepissonotus, P. bicolor.

References

Further reading

 
 
 
 

Delphacinae
Auchenorrhyncha genera
Articles created by Qbugbot